Karulina Kudi is a 1995 Indian Kannada-language drama film directed by V. P. Sarathy and produced by P. Dhanraj. The film stars Vishnuvardhan, Ambareesh and Sithara. The film was widely popular for the songs composed by Rajan–Nagendra upon release.

Cast 
 Vishnuvardhan 
 Ambareesh
 Sithara
 Shamili
 Jai Jagadish
 Doddanna
 Rajanand
 Sathyapriya
 Sriraksha
 Master Anand

Soundtrack 
The music of the film was composed by Rajan–Nagendra. This was the last collaboration of Rajan Nagendra and S Janaki. Their combination started in 1960

References

External links 

 Karulina Kudi at FlipKart

1995 drama films
1995 films
1990s Kannada-language films
Indian drama films
Films scored by Rajan–Nagendra